Udayamperoor is a town situated in Ernakulam district, Kerala, in India.

Geography

References

Cities and towns in Ernakulam district